Half Tide Rocks are a group of small barren rocks in Massachusetts Bay, located within the city limits of Boston, United States (and just outside the Town limits of Hull). The rocks are east of Aldridge Ledge, southeast of Devils Back, southwest of Green Island, northeast of Little Calf Island, and northwest of Calf Island. It borders the northwestern edge of the Hypocrite Channel.

Islands of Massachusetts
Landforms of Boston
Islands of Suffolk County, Massachusetts